The 2011–12 Bloomington Blaze season was the first season of the Central Hockey League (CHL) franchise in Bloomington, Illinois.

Regular season

Conference standings

Transactions
The Blaze have been involved in the following transactions during the 2011–12 season.

Trades

See also
 2011–12 CHL season

References

External links
 2011–12 Bloomington Blaze season at Pointstreak

Bloomington Blaze season, 2011-12
Bloomington